The Brixton Mosque and Islamic Cultural Centre (the "Brixton Mosque", or "Masjid ibn Taymeeyah") is a mosque located in Gresham Road in the Brixton area of South London. It is managed by Black British converts and is known for its history of controversy.

Controversies

Abdullah el-Faisal
Abdullah el-Faisal, a radical Takfiri Muslim cleric who preached in the UK until he was imprisoned for stirring up racial hatred and in 2007 deported to Jamaica, was associated with the Brixton Mosque in the early 1990s, preaching to crowds of up to 500 people.  In 1993, he was ejected by the mosque's administration who objected to his radical preaching.  In 2007, the London Evening Standard published an apology for referring to el-Faisal as the "Brixton Mosque preacher" on 12 April 2007, and clarified that el-Faisal only preached at Brixton Mosque in the early 1990s and not after 1994.

Richard Reid (the shoe bomber)
The mosque made international headlines when it was reported that Richard Reid, the so-called "shoe bomber", had attended the mosque from 1996 to 1998 after converting to Islam in jail. Abdul Haqq Baker, former chairman of mosque, told the BBC that Reid came to the mosque to learn about Islam, but fell in with what he called "more extreme elements" in London's Muslim community.  "We have been in contact with the police numerous times over the last five years to warn of the threat posed by militant groups operating in our area," said Baker in December 2001 after Reid's arrest.  He had warned that terrorist "talent scouts" prey on mosques like the Brixton mosque in search of the young and unstable. Baker warned the congregation, "The recruiting has got out of control.  Beware.  It's your sons, your teenagers who are plucked into these extreme groups."  A Time magazine article in 2002 said: "The Brixton Mosque is an ideal hunting ground for terrorist talent spotters since it attracts mainly young worshipers, including ex-convicts it helps rehabilitate."

Zacarias Moussaoui
Zacarias Moussaoui, who was convicted of conspiring to kill citizens of the US as part of the September 11, 2001, terrorist attacks, frequented the mosque between 1996 and 1997.  Some sources report that it was during this period that he met Richard Reid, though others are less certain. Moussaoui was expelled from the mosque after he began wearing combat fatigues and a backpack to the mosque, and pressured the cleric to provide him with information on how to join the jihad.

See also

Islam in London
Islam in the United Kingdom
Islamic terrorism
Islamic schools and branches
Islamism
Islamism in London
List of mosques
List of mosques in the United Kingdom

References

External links
Official website
Recent Short Documentary of Brixton Mosque
"London mosque leader recalls bomb suspect: Interview with Abdul Haqq Baker", CNN, 26 December 2001
"The Devil's Deception of Abdullaah Faisal ('Sheikh Faisal'); Critical Study of Abdullah el-Faisal's Methodology"; SalafiManhaj (2007)
"A view from the inside:  Abdul Haqq Baker provides an account of the Brixton Mosque and the shifting perceptions towards it, since it was founded," Abdul Haqq Baker, Criminal Justice Matters, Volume 73, Issue 1 (September 2008), pp. 24–25
Islam in London: Documentary about Brixton Mosque

Mosques in London
Religion in the London Borough of Lambeth
Buildings and structures in the London Borough of Lambeth
Islamic organizations established in 1990
Brixton
Mosque-related controversies in Europe
Salafi mosques in the United Kingdom